The Primetime Emmy Award for Outstanding Cinematography for a Reality Program is awarded to one program each year. In 2006, the category was called Outstanding Cinematography for Nonfiction Programming – Multi-Camera Productions. Reality programs competed with documentaries prior to 2006 in a combined category for Outstanding Cinematography for Nonfiction Programming (Single or Multi-Camera).

In the following list, the first titles listed in gold are the winners; those not in gold are nominees, which are listed in alphabetical order. The years given are those in which the ceremonies took place:

Winners and nominations

2000s

2010s

2020s

Programs with multiple awards

6 wins
 Life Below Zero

5 wins
 Deadliest Catch

2 wins
 The Amazing Race

Programs with multiple nominations
Totals include nominations for Outstanding Cinematography for a Nonfiction Program.

18 nominations
 Survivor

17 nominations
 The Amazing Race

12 nominations
 Deadliest Catch

8 nominations
 Life Below Zero
 Project Runway

7 nominations
 Top Chef

5 nominations
 RuPaul's Drag Race

4 nominations
 Intervention
 Queer Eye

3 nominations
 Born This Way

2 nominations
 The Apprentice
 Dirty Jobs

References

Cinematography for a Reality Program